Michael Hilgers (born 6 August 1966) is a former field hockey forward from Germany, who won the silver medal at the 1988 Summer Olympics. Four years later, when Barcelona, Spain hosted the Summer Olympics, he was a member of the Men's National Team that captured the gold medal. Playing club hockey for Gladbacher HTC during his career, he later on became the chief-executive of the Warsteiner HockeyPark in Mönchengladbach, which hosted the 2006 Men's Hockey World Cup.

References
 databaseOlympics

External links
 

1966 births
Living people
Field hockey players at the 1988 Summer Olympics
Field hockey players at the 1992 Summer Olympics
German male field hockey players
Olympic field hockey players of West Germany
Olympic field hockey players of Germany
Olympic gold medalists for Germany
Olympic silver medalists for West Germany
Place of birth missing (living people)
Olympic medalists in field hockey
Medalists at the 1992 Summer Olympics
Medalists at the 1988 Summer Olympics
1990 Men's Hockey World Cup players
20th-century German people